Radical 1 or radical one meaning "one" is one of the 6 Kangxi radicals (214 radicals in total) composed of 1 stroke.

In the Kangxi Dictionary, there are 42 characters (out of 49,030) to be found under this radical.

 is also the 1st indexing component in the Table of Indexing Chinese Character Components predominantly adopted by Simplified Chinese dictionaries published in mainland China.

Evolution

Derived characters

In calligraphy

The only stroke in radical one, known as  héng "horizontal", is called  cè in the eight principles of the character 永 ( Yǒngzì Bāfǎ) which are the basis of Chinese calligraphy.

References

Literature

Notes

See also

Chinese numerals

001
001